Sanjay Gadhvi is an Indian film director and writer who is known for the first two installments of the Dhoom series.

Early life
Sanjay Gadhvi was born to Manubhai Gadhvi, a prominent figure in Gujarati folk literature. His father moved into Mumbai's first 14-floor skyscraper on Peddar Road before he was born. As a child he studied in Campion School and was friends with prominent industrialist Kumar Mangalam Birla.

Career
He made his directorial debut with Tere Liye (2000) which went unnoticed. The film was earlier titled Tu Hi Bataa and the movie had starred Arjun Rampal and Raveena Tandon, but the movie stalled due to low budget.

His first film with Yash Raj Films was Mere Yaar Ki Shaadi Hai (2002). The film enjoyed moderate success.

He first gained attention when he directed the action thriller Dhoom in 2004.

He then directed the sequel to Dhoom, called Dhoom 2. The film starred three of the main actors from the previous film: Abhishek Bachchan, Uday Chopra and Rimi Sen. Hrithik Roshan, Aishwarya Rai and Bipasha Basu joined the cast.

Awards
Gadhvi won the 2007 Stardust Awards in "Hottest Young Film Maker title" category for Dhoom 2 (2006) .

Filmography

References

External links 
 
 

Living people
21st-century Indian film directors
Hindi-language film directors
Film directors from Mumbai
Year of birth missing (living people)
Gadhavi (surname)